Prodger is a surname of Welsh origin. It is an anglicisation of the name ap Rosier, literally "son of Roger". Notable people with the surname include:

 Charlotte Prodger (born 1974), British video artist
 John Prodger (born 1935), English cricketer
 Matt Prodger, British journalist
 Phillip Prodger (born 1967), British museum curator and art historian

See also
 George Prodgers (1891-1935), Canadian ice hockey player
 Prosser (name)

Surnames of Welsh origin
Patronymic surnames
Surnames from given names